Kayode Kasum is a Nigerian movie and music video director and producer.

Education 
He attended Yaba College of Technology.

Career 
Kasum started his career in film making as a motion graphics designer at Wale Adenuga Productions. He also worked as a producer in an advertising company. His first feature film, Dognapped and Nigeria's first live action animation film was released in 2017. He however gained popularity for his film titled Oga Bolaji which was released in 2018 and has made other Nollywood productions including Sugar Rush and Toyin Abraham's Fate of Alakada.

Kasum is credited with directing Nigeria’s first live-action animated movie and one of Nigeria’s highest-grossing film ever.

He was nominated for The Future Awards Africa 2019 prize for Filmmaking and was listed as one of the top Nollywood film directors of 2020.

Filmography 

Dognapped 
This Lady Called Life 
Oga Bolaji 
Kambili: The Whole 30 Yards 
Quams Money 
 Sugar Rush
Fate of Alakada
The Therapist
Ponzi
 Love is Yellow
 Sweet face
 Killing Jade
 Phases
 Unbroken
Dwindle
Soole

Awards and nominations

See also
 List of Nigerian film producers
 List of Nigerian film directors

References

External links 

Year of birth missing (living people)
Living people
Yoruba people
Nigerian film directors
Nigerian film producers
Yaba College of Technology alumni
Nigerian writers
Nigerian animators